Abram Pye Haring (November 15, 1840 – February 22, 1915) was an American soldier who fought in the American Civil War. Haring received his country's highest award for bravery during combat, the Medal of Honor. Haring's medal was won for his actions at Bachelor's Creek in North Carolina. Haring and the eleven men under his command resisted an overwhelming attack from Confederate forces on February 1, 1864. He was honored with the award on June 28, 1890.

Haring was born in Cornwall-on-Hudson, New York, and entered service in New York City, where he was later buried.

Medal of Honor citation

See also

Jackson's Valley Campaign
Second Battle of Deep Bottom
Siege of Petersburg

Notes

References

External links

New York State Military Museum and Veterans Research Center - Civil War - 132nd Infantry Regiment History, photographs, table of battles and casualties, and historical sketch for the 132nd New York Infantry Regiment
Civil War in the East 132nd New York Infantry Regiment "2nd Regiment Empire Brigade "
National Park Service Regiment Details UNION NEW YORK VOLUNTEERS
Headquarters, Outposts, Bachelor's Creek Near New Bern, NC Pencil sketch done in 1863 by its commander, George H. Hitchcock

1840 births
1915 deaths
American Civil War recipients of the Medal of Honor
Burials in New York (state)
People from Cornwall-on-Hudson, New York
People of New York (state) in the American Civil War
Union Army officers
United States Army Medal of Honor recipients